Silky Nutmeg Ganache (born December 31, 1990) is an American drag performer from Chicago, Illinois, who came to international attention in 2019 when she competed on the eleventh season of RuPaul's Drag Race finishing in third place, and later competed on the sixth season of RuPaul's Drag Race All Stars in 2021. She has also been involved in numerous Drag Race spin-offs, including RuPaul's Drag Race: Vegas Revue (2020) and RuPaul's Secret Celebrity Drag Race (2022). She also competed in the international All Stars spin-off series, Canada's Drag Race: Canada vs. the World in 2022, finishing as runner-up.

Early life and education
Ganache was born on December 30, 1990, in the South but eventually moved to Chicago as a young adult.  Steele graduated from Moss Point High School in 2008.  Steele has a master's degree in organizational leadership. According to Ganache's website she is looking to begin studies for a PhD, also stating on an episode of Hey Qween! in 2020 she would be beginning doctoral studies in 2021. Because of her Master's and PhD pursuit, she is often jokingly referred to as "The Reverend Dr. Silky Nutmeg Ganache".

She went to Wabash College, an all-male college, where she thought of her original drag name, "Lasagna Frozeen".  Her mentor later dubbed her "Silky" because she could be rough around the edges but also classy.  Ganache went home where she watched the Food Network.  While watching a program, Ganache overheard the phrase "silky ganache."  From there, she would hence be known as "Silky Nutmeg Ganache".  She earned her MBA in organizational leadership from Indiana Wesleyan University in December 2017. Her drag mother is Vanessa Ryan, who mentored Ganache in drag during her college years in Indiana. Silky considers her official drag beginning “anniversary” to be March 18, 2012.

Career

Ganache has participated in many pageants, and has over 100 competition credits. Her pageant history includes Miss Gay Indiana University 2014 (winner), Indiana All American Goddess at Large 2014 (first alternate), Miss Unlimited Newcomer 2015 (winner), Miss Latina Continental Plus 2017 (winner), Miss Continental Plus 2017 (second alternate), and Miss Illinois Continental Plus 2018 (first alternate).

Prior to her time on RuPaul's Drag Race, she performed drag for six years, working at Hydrate, Roscoe’s Tavern, Splash and Berlin in Boystown.

Ganache was announced to be one of fifteen contestants competing on season eleven of RuPaul's Drag Race on January 24, 2019. She won two main challenges, in episode four and eight.
Ganache portrayed Oprah Winfrey for her winning performance in Trump: The Rusical.
Ts Madison, whom Ganache portrayed in the season's Snatch Game challenge, praised Ganache for her performance. In episode 11, Ganache landed in the bottom two, where she sent home Nina West to TLC's "No Scrubs". In the season finale, held in Los Angeles’ Orpheum Theatre, Ganache was a part of the final four, and lip-synced against Brooke Lynn Hytes to Destiny's Child's "Bootylicious", which she lost, finishing the competition in 3rd/4th place alongside A'keria Chanel Davenport.

On July 24, 2019, Ganache performed alongside Iggy Azalea at the Bowery Ballroom in New York City.

Ganache guest starred in Germany's Next Topmodel, alongside fellow RuPaul's Drag Race alum Derrick Barry and Vanessa Vanjie Mateo.

She appeared in a music video for Lizzo's song "Juice" on April 17, 2019.

From March 26 to September 6, she was a part of the rotating cast for RuPaul's Drag Race: Season 11 Tour, presented by Voss Events and World of Wonder, and hosted by Asia O'Hara. The show kicked off in Los Angeles on May 26 during the RuPaul's DragCon LA wrap party (hosted by Drag Race judge Michelle Visage) and concluded with a final bow on September 6 in New York City (also hosted by Visage) at the top of RuPaul’s DragCon NYC. In April 2020, amid the coronavirus pandemic, Ganache was announced as a featured cast member for the very first Digital Drag Fest, an online drag festival for all ages, with attendees given opportunities to interact with the artists, tip them, and win prizes during the broadcast.

In 2020, she was featured in Magnus Hastings' Rainbow Revolution photography book.

Ganache is set to star in her own series on WOWPresents Plus series entitled Shantay You Pray, a series exploring Ganache's relationship with religion. She is also set to star in Nightmare Neighbors with Silky & Vanjie, another WOWPresents series with Vanessa Vanjie Mateo, a docuseries chronicling their life together as they move into the same apartment.

Silky was announced to be one of thirteen contestants competing on the sixth season of RuPaul's Drag Race All Stars on May 26, 2021. She was eliminated in the third episode, placing 11th overall. Soon after her elimination, she released Cocktails for a Queen, an alcoholic beverage recipe book inspired by Drag Race alum. She returned in the tenth episode as a part of the "Game Within a Game" twist, making "herstory" as the queen with most lip-syncs in a single episode, with seven, and the most lip-sync wins in a single episode with six.

Silky was announced to be apart of the nine contestants competing on the first season of Canada's Drag Race: Canada vs. the World on October 17, 2022. Silky won 2 maxi challenges and placed in the bottom once, where she sent home Vanity Milan to ”Freak” by Estelle featuring Kardinal Offishall. Silky eventually placed runner up in the season after losing the lip-sync for the crown of Celine Dion’s cover of “River Deep – Mountain High” to Ra'Jah O'Hara.

 Personal life 
She is a registered Republican. In the Drag Race'' episode "Trump: The Rusical", she explained that this is because of party gerrymandering and "gentrification and movement of the districts", and stated that despite her official party affiliation, she does not vote for Republican politicians. She says "It's very important that people realize that if you want to stop that within the political process, get smarter than them. Register as a Republican, and they'll have to redo everything."

After her run on RuPaul's Drag Race, Ganache later revealed that due to the online hate and abuse she received, she fell into a depression and nearly quit drag.

Filmography

Television

Web series

Music videos

Discography

Featured singles

Awards and nominations

References

External links

 

1990 births
Living people
African-American drag queens
California Republicans
LGBT Christians
LGBT people from Illinois
LGBT people from Mississippi
People from Chicago
People from Moss Point, Mississippi
RuPaul's Drag Race All Stars contestants
RuPaul's Drag Race contestants
Wabash College alumni
Indiana Wesleyan University alumni